XHCRI-FM was a noncommercial radio station on 91.5 FM in San Cristóbal de las Casas, Chiapas. It was owned by Francisco José Narvaez Rincón and is known as Cristal FM.

History
XHCRI received its permit on July 27, 2000 and signed on in time for Christmas, making it the first FM station in the city. Its owner already owned XEWM-AM, and for the first five years of its life it simulcast XEWM's programming. In 2005, XHCRI began carrying its own programs, separate from XEWM.

XHCRI carried talk programs during the day and musical programming at night. Its permit expired in 2010 and an attempted renewal was made two months late. As a result, XHCRI-FM ceased transmissions effective April 25, 2016.

References

Radio stations in Chiapas
San Cristóbal de las Casas
Defunct radio stations in Mexico
Radio stations established in 2000
Radio stations disestablished in 2016
2000 establishments in Mexico
2016 disestablishments in Mexico